William Curtis was an English botanist.

William or Will Curtis may also refer to:

Nobility
Sir William Curtis, 2nd Baronet (1782–1847), of the Curtis baronets
Sir William Curtis, 3rd Baronet (1804–1870), of the Curtis baronets
Sir William Michael Curtis, 4th Baronet (1859–1916), of the Curtis baronets
Sir William Peter Curtis, 7th Baronet (1935–2014), of the Curtis baronets

Sports
William Buckingham Curtis (1837–1900), father of American amateur athletics
William Curtis (cricketer) (1881–1962), English cricketer
William Curtis (baseball) (fl. 1924), American baseball player

Others
William Curtis (priest) (1695–1757), Irish Anglican priest
Sir William Curtis, 1st Baronet (1752–1829), English businessman, banker and politician
William Dexter Curtis (1857–1935), mayor of Madison, Wisconsin
William J. R. Curtis (born 1948), English architectural historian
Will Curtis, fictional character in Holby City

See also

Curtis (surname)
Bill Curtis (disambiguation)
Billy Curtis (1909–1988), American film and television actor
Bill Kurtis (born 1940), American television journalist